The House of Orbeliani was a Georgian noble family (tavadi), which branched off the House of Baratashvili in the 17th century and later produced several lines variously called Orbeliani, Orbelishvili (ორბელიშვილი), Qaplanishvili (ყაფლანიშვილი), and Jambakur(ian)-Orbeliani (ჯამბაკურ[იან]-ორბელიანი). They were prominent in Georgia's politics, culture, and science; remained so under the Russian rule in the 19th century – when most of the Orbeliani lines were received among the princely nobility (knyaz) of the Russian Empire – and into the 20th century.

History 
The Orbeliani sprang off the princes Baratashvili – themselves possible descendants of the medieval house of Liparitid-Orbeli – amid the bloody family feuds in the 17th century. The latter-day Orbeliani claimed Chinese imperial descent and the gentilitial title of Janbakur (later Jambakur; in Persian, "Son of Heaven of China").

This new princely dynasty received the surname of Orbelishvili (later Orbeliani) or Qaplanishvili after its two early members – Orbel (fl. 1600) and his son Qaplan (killed in 1671). The Orbeliani were in possession of a large fief called Saorbelo or Saqaplanishvilo which comprised the southern part of the Baratashvili princedom (Sabaratiano), including much of the Ktsia and the Dmanisi valleys in what is now the Kvemo Kartli region of Georgia. They were considered among the six "undivided" houses of the Kingdom of Kartli, which outranked those that had succumbed to the weakening division of their dynastic allods.

By the early course of the 17th century, when Kartli was under the Safavid Iranian sway, the Baratashvili-Orbeliani clan was the largest noble family in Kartli.

By the 18th century, the Orbeliani exercised sovereignty over almost 100 lesser noble families (aznauri) and 2,000 peasants who lived in nearly 160 villages. They had a palace and familial abbey in Tandzia, castles at Dmanisi, Kveshi and Khuluti, and monasteries in Pitareti and Dmanisi. The members of the Orbeliani family were enfeoffed of the offices of High Constable of Somkhiti, Lord Chief Justice and, jointly with the House of Mukhrani and Panaskerteli, Prince-Master of the Palace of Georgia.

Towards the end of the 18th century, the Orbeliani left their patrimonial estates in Kvemo Kartli – plagued by incessant forays by the Turkic tribes – and resettled in Tbilisi, the capital of Georgia.

After the Russian annexation of Georgia, seven Orbeliani lines were recognized in a princely rank: four as Princes Dzhambakurian-Orbeliani, one as Princes Dzhambakur-Orbelianov (Джамбакур-Орбелианов), and two as Princes Orbelianov (Орбельянов). Other variations of the surname include Orbelianoff and Arbeloff (primarily in Europe and the USA), and Арбелієв or Арбелов in Ukraine and Russia.

Notable members 
Otar Beg Orbeliani (b. circa. 1583, fl. 17th century), a governor and military commander
Vakhushti Khan Orbeliani (d. 1667/69), a governor
Sulkhan-Saba Orbeliani (1658–1725), a writer, monk, and diplomat
Gorjasbi Beg Orbeliani (fl. 17th century), a military commander and governor
David Orbeliani (1739–1796), a soldier, politician, and translator
Alexander Orbeliani (1802–1869), a poet, playwright, journalist, and historian
Grigol Orbeliani (1804–1883), a poet, and soldier
Vakhtang Orbeliani (1812–1890), a poet and soldier
Georgi Ilich Orbeliani (1853–1924), a soldier
Ivan Makarovich Orbeliani (1844-1919), a general

References 

Noble families of Georgia (country)
Russian noble families